The Sanjiv Ridge mine, formerly the Corunna Downs mine is an iron ore mine operated by Atlas Iron and located in the Pilbara region of Western Australia,  south of Marble Bar and  from Port Hedland. Ore from the mine is transported overland via road train to the Utah Point Bulk Commodities Berth at Port Hedland.

Overview

Approval to construct an iron ore process plant at Corunna Downs was received in September 2017. The mine was proposed to consist of five open pits, with an anticipated  of iron ore to be mined at the location over a six year period.

The Corunna Downs was temporarily suspended by Atlas in 2017 because of low iron ore prices, having initially intended to spend A$53 million to develop the project.

Haulage of iron ore from Sanjiv Ridge commenced in late February 2021, having crushed its first ore at the mine earlier that month. Having exhausted the Pardoo, Wodgina, Abydos and Mt Dove mines at this point, Atlas was operating just two mines, Sanjiv Ridge and Mt Webber. A third mine, Miralga Creek, commenced operations a year later, in late February 2022.

The Sanjiv Ridge mine was renamed in 2021 after the company's CEO, Sanjiv Manchanda, from its original name, Corunna Downs mine.

References

External links
 Atlas Iron Limited website
 MINEDEX website: Sanjiv Ridge Database of the Department of Mines, Industry Regulation and Safety

Atlas Iron
Iron ore mines in Western Australia
Surface mines in Australia
Shire of East Pilbara
2021 establishments in Australia